Sushil Kanwar is an Indian politician from the Bhartiya Janta Party and Zila Pramukh Of Ajmer District, Rajasthan, She was a member of the Rajasthan Legislative Assembly representing the Masuda Vidhan Sabha constituency of Rajasthan.

References 

Living people
Bharatiya Janata Party politicians from Rajasthan
Rajasthan MLAs 2013–2018
Year of birth missing (living people)